The canton of Matoury (French: Canton de Matoury) is one of the former cantons of the Guyane department in French Guiana. It was located in the arrondissement of Cayenne. Its administrative seat was located in Matoury, the canton's sole commune. Its population was 29,712 in 2012.

Administration

References

Matoury